Troginae is a subfamily of beetles in the family Trogidae which includes extant species and extinct beetle species from the Lower Cretaceous. The subfamily contains the following genera:

Glyptotrox Nikolajev, 2016
Paratrox Nikolajev, 2009
Phoberus MacLeay, 1819
Trox Fabricius, 1775

References

Trogidae